Giacomo Monico (1776–1851) was an Italian prelate who was named Patriarch of Venice in 1827 and Cardinal in 1833.

Life 
Born in Riese, he was educated in the seminary of the diocese of Treviso and ordained in 1801. He then taught at local seminary before being named parish pastor in Asolo. In 1823 he was appointed as bishop of Ceneda, now Vittorio Veneto. In 1827 he was named Patriarch of Venice. During his tenure as head of the diocese of Venice he was a strong supporter of the rule of the house of Habsburg, and after the defeat of the Republic of San Marco he presided over a solemn Te Deum in the Basilica of San Marco.

Although becoming a cardinal in 1833, he didn't participate in the conclave of 1846. He died in 1851.

References 

1776 births
1851 deaths
People from the Province of Treviso
Patriarchs of Venice
19th-century Italian Roman Catholic archbishops
Cardinals created by Pope Gregory XVI